Ernest Ferdinand of Brunswick-Wolfenbüttel-Bevern (4 March 1682 in Osterholz – 14 April 1746 in Brunswick) was a titular Duke of Brunswick and Lüneburg.  He was Prince of Brunswick-Bevern and founder of the younger Brunswick-Bevern line.

Life 
He was born in 1682 as the fourth son of Duke Ferdinand Albert I of Brunswick-Bevern and his wife, Landgravine Christine of Hesse-Eschwege.  On 1 May 1706, he became a colonel in the Prussian army.  In December of that year he succeeded his twin brother, Ferdinand Christian (d. 1706) as provost of the chapters of St. Blaise and St. Cyriakus in Brunswick.

On 1 March 1735, his elder brother, Duke Ferdinand Albert II of Brunswick-Bevern inherited Brunswick-Wolfenbüttel.  Ferdinand Albert II then gave Brunswick-Bevern to Ernest Ferdinand as an apanage.

Ernest Ferdinand died in Brunswick in 1746.  He was the founder of the younger Brunswick-Bevern line, which died out with the death of his son Frederick Charles Ferdinand in 1809

Marriage and issue 

On 4 August 1714, he married Eleonore Charlotte of Courland (1686-1748), daughter of Frederick Casimir Kettler, with whom he had thirteen children:
 August William (1715-1781)
 Christine Sophie (1717-1779), married Margrave Frederick Ernest of Brandenburg-Kulmbach (1703-1762)
 Frederica (1719-1772)
 George Louis (1721-1747), father of Danish courtesan Støvlet-Cathrine Benthagen
 Ernestine (1721)
 George Frederick (1723-1766)
 Amalia (1724-1726)
 Charles William (1725)
 Frederick August (1726-1729)
 Anne Marie (1728-1754)
 Frederick Charles Ferdinand (1729-1809), Danish Marshal
 John Charles (1731-1732)

Ancestors

References 
 Christof Römer (ed.): Braunschweig-Bevern. Ein Fürstenhaus als europäische Dynastie, 1667–1884, Brunswick State Museum, Brunswick, 1997, p. 57–58
 

18th-century German military personnel
Dukes of Brunswick-Lüneburg
House of Brunswick-Bevern
Major generals of Prussia
1746 deaths
1682 births
Burials at Brunswick Cathedral